The Communist Alternative Party (Partito di Alternativa Comunista, PdAC) is a communist political party in Italy. Its leader and founder is Francesco Ricci.

History
In April 2006 some members of Communist Project, a trotskyist faction within the Communist Refoundation Party (PRC), left the party and launched the PdAC, which was officially founded on 7 January 2007. In June 2006, the Communist Project itself left Communist Refoundation under the new name of Communist Workers' Party.

In the 2008 general election the PdAC, that candidated Fabiana Stefanoni for Prime Minister, obtained the 0.01% of the vote for the Chamber of Deputies (the party presented its list in the only constituency "Lazio 2").

In the 2013 general election, with Adriano Lotito as candidate, the party presented its list only in Apulia and obtained 0.02% of the vote for the Chamber and  the 0.01% for the Senate.

Party relations 
The PdAC is affiliated to the International Workers League (Fourth International), a Morenist Trotskyist political international. The party has a very conflicting relationship with the Workers' Communist Party (PCL), another Trotskyist political organization in Italy.

Electoral results

Italian Parliament

Regional Councils

References

External links
Official website

2006 establishments in Italy
Communist parties in Italy
Far-left politics in Italy
International Workers League – Fourth International
Political parties established in 2007
Trotskyist organisations in Italy